Filton Town Council is a council made up of thirteen councillors and manages the council precept on behalf of Filton taxpayers

Councillors
As at May 2018 the composition of the council is 9 Labour, 2 Conservative, and 2 UKIP councillors. The last election was held on 7 May 2015.

Administration
The Council is administered by three council staff. Lesley Reuben is the town clerk.

Controversy
The council was forced to abandon plans to level Elm Park playing fields in Filton following criticism in the Bristol Evening Post.

References

External links
 Filton Town Council
 Filton Town Council in the news
 Audit commission Article
 Audit Commission letter

Local government in Gloucestershire
Filton